Berosus metalliceps is a species of hydrophilid beetles from the United States, Mexico, the Bahamas and Cuba.

References

Hydrophilinae
Beetles described in 1882